Heerapur Gokal is a panchayat near Afzalgarh block in Dhampur tehsil Bijnor District in the Indian state of Uttar Pradesh. It is located at the border with the state of Uttarakhand.

Geography
Heerapur Gokal is located at 29°24′N 78°41′E, or 29.4°N 78.68°E.[1] It has an average elevation of 212 metres (695 feet). The nearby cities are Kalagarh, Sherkot, Dhampur, Jaspur and Kashipur.

History
The village was founded in mid-19th century, by a Heera Singh Saini, who came from the Himalaya side with many cows. These cows were short in height. The same type of cow is still available in this village raised by Saini families. After the name of Heera Sigh Saini and their cow, this village became Heerapur Gokal (meaning village of Heera having cow family). It is located in the Afzalgarh Development Block, Dhampur tehsil.

Demographics
As of 2011 Indian Census, Heerapur Gokal had a total population of 3,063, of which 1,618 were males and 1,455 were females. Population within the age group of 0 to 6 years was 405.

References

Villages in Bijnor district